There are more than 200 named lakes located partially or entirely within the Municipality of Temagami, Northeastern Ontario, Canada. They are located in all 25 geographic townships comprising this  municipality. The largest, by both area and volume, is Lake Temagami. Other significant lakes include Cross Lake, Gull Lake, Net Lake, Obabika Lake and Rabbit Lake.

Temagami's lakes are situated in two watersheds. To the east, the Ottawa River basin drains lake water via the Matabitchuan River, which flows into Lake Timiskaming then enters the Ottawa River. The Great Lakes Basin to the west drains lake water via the Sturgeon River which flows into Lake Nipissing then enters the French River, eventually reaching Georgian Bay of Lake Huron.

The lakes are a main source of tourism and recreational activity in the Municipality of Temagami. This includes camping, canoeing, fishing, cottaging and youth camps (e.g. Keewaydin), as well as lodge and resort activity. The first recorded tourist was an oblate priest named Charles Paradis, who visited the area in July 1880 and eventually settled on Lake Temagami's Sandy Inlet. Despite its remote location and inaccessibility by rail until 1904, the Temagami area attracted increasing numbers of hardy tourists who arrived, as Paradis had done, by canoe from Lake Timiskaming in the east, or from the west travelling up the Sturgeon River from its intersection with the Canadian Pacific Railway. A wide variety of fish species are found in Temagami lakes, including walleye, smallmouth bass, lake trout, rainbow trout, brook trout, northern pike and perch.

List
The list is alphabetized by the name of the lake, with the words lake and the ignored. To sort on a different column, click on the arrows in the header row.

A

B

C

D

E

F

G

H

I

J

K

L

M

N

O

P

Q

R

S

T

U

V

W

Z

See also
List of lakes of Ontario

References

 
Lists of lakes of Canada
Lakes, Temagami